Troides staudingeri is a birdwing butterfly in the genus Troides in the family Papilionidae. It is known from Leti Island, Moa Island, Kisar Island, Babar Island and Wetar Island.

Subspecies
T. s. staudingeri (Sermata, Luang, Babar)
T. s. iris (Röber, 1888) (Leti Group)
T. s. ariadne Rothschild, 1908 (Islands of Romang Strait)
T. s. heptanonius Fruhstorfer, 1913 (Damar Island)
T. s. ikarus Fruhstorfer, 1904 (Tanimbar, Selaru, Yamdena, Larat)
T. s. rikyu Arima & Morimoto, 1991 (Teun, Nila, Serua)

Biology
Like T. haliphron, T. staudingeri is a lowland species.

Biogeographic realm
Australasian realm.

Etymology
The specific name staudingeri honours the German entomologist Otto Staudinger.

Taxonomy
Previously considered to be a subspecies of haliphron, staudingeri was raised to a full species by Haugum and Low on the basis of differences in the genitali. This was accepted by Hancock.

Related species
Troides staudingeri is a member of the Troides haliphron species group. The members of this clade are:

Troides haliphron (Boisduval, 1836)
Troides darsius (Gray, [1853])
Troides vandepolli (Snellen, 1890)
Troides criton (C. & R. Felder, 1860)
Troides riedeli (Kirsch, 1885)
Troides plato (Wallace, 1865)
Troides staudingeri (Röber, 1888)

References

D'Abrera, B. (1975) Birdwing Butterflies of the World. Country Life Books, London.
Haugum, J. & Low, A.M. 1978-1985. A Monograph of the Birdwing Butterflies. 2 volumes. Scandinavian Press, Klampenborg; 663 pp.
Hancock, D.L. (1983). Classification of the Papilionidae (Lepidoptera): a phylogenetic approach. Smithersia 2: 1-48.
Kurt Rumbucher and Oliver Schäffler, 2004 Part 19, Papilionidae X. Troides III. in Erich Bauer and Thomas Frankenbach Eds. Butterflies of the World. Keltern: Goecke & Evers 
Other literature at Troides

External links

The World of Birdwing Butterflies
BOLD Consortium for the Barcode of Life images, molecular information.
Timor and Wetar Deciduous Forests Ecoregion

staudingeri
Butterflies of Indonesia
Endemic fauna of Indonesia
Fauna of the Barat Daya Islands
Butterflies described in 1888